Clécy is a commune in the Calvados department in the Normandy region in northwestern France.

In 1932 it was awarded the title The Capital of Norman Switzerland by the Tourism Minister Monsieur Gourdeau.

Geography

Clécy is on the River Orne, in the middle of Norman Switzerland, about s south of Caen. Covering  it is the largest commune in the canton of Thury-Harcourt.

Called the "Capital of Norman Switzerland", this village owes its fame to the rugged and verdant Armorican massif, with valleys through which the Orne flows.

Plenty of outdoor activities are available: kayaking, paragliding, climbing, hill walking and mountain biking, taking advantage of the geology of Norman Switzerland.

History
The name "Clécy" is mentioned in 860 in the reign of Charles the Bald.

When French cantons were created, Clécy was the capital of the canton. This ceased to be the case after restructuring in 1801.

Clécy has a wealth of historical treasures: Châteaux and manor houses are spread all over Clécy and its surroundings. The Château de la Landelle is one of the oldest.

More recently, painters such as Paul-Émile Pissarro, Moteley and Hardy  have painted landscapes around Clécy.

Administration

Population

Its inhabitants are called Clécyens.

Economy
 Fromagerie Vallée (Valley Cheesemaker)

Sights

 The Château de La Landelle is one of the oldest monuments in the village. At its base it is in the form of a cross, originally on one floor, but was changed to two floors when the wings were reworked. In the Second World War it was occupied by the Germans.
 Rochers des Parcs (Park rocks)
 Pain de sucre (Sugarloaf)
 Musée Hardy (Hardy Museum) 
 Musée du chemin de fer miniature (Museum of miniature trains)
 Manoir de Placy (Placy Manor) (16th century)
 Eglise St Pierre (St Paul's church) (15th century)
 Clécy Viaduct (1866)

Personalities
 Paul-Émile Pissarro prolific landscape painter who moved to Clécy in 1936.

See also
 Communes of the Calvados department

References

External links 

 Clécy sur le site de la communauté de communes
 Chemin de fer miniature de Clécy

Communes of Calvados (department)